Kedarnath Legislative Assembly constituency is one of the seventy electoral Uttarakhand Legislative Assembly constituencies of Uttarakhand state in India. It includes Ukhimath Tehsil & KC Chopta Jakhani of Rudraprayag Tehsil area.

Kedarnath Legislative Assembly constituency is a part of Garhwal (Lok Sabha constituency).

Members of Legislative Assembly

Election results

2022

See also
 Badri–Kedar (Uttarakhand Assembly constituency)

References

External link
  
http://ceo.uk.gov.in/files/oversease%20election/English/7.pdf
http://election.uk.gov.in/pdf_roll/01012010/A007/A007.pdf
http://eci.nic.in/eci_main/CurrentElections/CONSOLIDATED_ORDER%20_ECI%20.pdf
http://www.elections.in/uttarakhand/assembly-constituencies/kedarnath.html
https://web.archive.org/web/20090619064401/http://gov.ua.nic.in/ceouttranchal/ceo/ac_pc.aspx
https://web.archive.org/web/20101201021552/http://gov.ua.nic.in/ceouttranchal/ceo/ac_detl.aspx

Rudraprayag district
Assembly constituencies of Uttarakhand